Kepler-296e (also known by its Kepler Object of Interest designation KOI-1422.05) is a confirmed Earth-sized exoplanet orbiting within the habitable zone of Kepler-296. The planet was discovered by NASA's Kepler spacecraft using the transit method, in which the dimming effect that a planet causes as it crosses in front of its star is measured. NASA announced the discovery of the exoplanet on 26 February 2014.

Confirmed exoplanet 
Kepler-296e is a super-Earth with a radius 1.75 times that of Earth. The planet orbits Kepler-296 once every 34.1 days.

Habitability 
The planet was announced as being located within the habitable zone of Kepler-296, a region where liquid water could exist on the surface of the planet. As of 2017, with an ESI of 0.85, it is the fifth-most Earth-like planet after Kepler-438b, TRAPPIST-1 d, and two Gliese-designated planets,  GJ 3323 b      and  GJ 273 b, which were both discovered in 2017.

See also 
 Habitability of red dwarf systems
 List of potentially habitable exoplanets

References

External links 
 NASA – Kepler Mission.
 NASA – Kepler Discoveries – Summary Table.
 NASA – Kepler-296e at The NASA Exoplanet Archive.
 NASA – Kepler-296e at The Exoplanet Data Explorer.
 NASA – Kepler-296e at The Extrasolar Planets Encyclopaedia.
 Habitable Exolanets Catalog at UPR-Arecibo.

Exoplanets discovered in 2014
296e
Exoplanets in the habitable zone
Super-Earths in the habitable zone
Transiting exoplanets
Kepler-296